The Europe Cup 1952 was the fourth Rugby Union European championship, organized by FIRA.

After the Second World War rugby activity restarted in Europe with the Five Nations restarting in 1947. The FIRA approved to reorganize the European Championship, after three tournaments in 1936-38. During the assembly of May 20, 1951, it was decided that the name of tournament would be Europe Cup, and that the first edition was to be played in 1952. Like in all subsequent editions, only countries of Continental Europe ever took place.

A "challenge" format was chosen: France, winner of the last tournament in 1938, advanced directly to the final, where it met the winner of the preliminary tournament, which was played by four teams: Belgium, West Germany, Italy and Spain.

Results

Preliminary tournament

Semifinals

Finals

Great Final

Bibliography 
 Francesco Volpe, Valerio Vecchiarelli (2000), 2000 Italia in Meta, Storia della nazionale italiana di rugby dagli albori al Sei Nazioni, GS Editore (2000) 
 Francesco Volpe, Paolo Pacitti (Author), Rugby 2000, GTE Gruppo Editorale (1999).

References

External links
 FIRA-AER official website

1952
1952 rugby union tournaments for national teams
1951–52 in French rugby union
rugby union
1952 in German sport
1952 in Belgian sport
1952 in Spanish sport